KBTA-FM (99.5 FM) is a radio station  broadcasting an adult contemporary format. Licensed to Batesville, Arkansas, United States. The station is currently owned by WRD Entertainment.

References

External links

See also
List of radio stations in Arkansas

BTA-FM
Mainstream adult contemporary radio stations in the United States
Radio stations established in 1999
1999 establishments in Arkansas